Coleophora vancouverensis is a moth of the family Coleophoridae. It is found in Canada.

The larvae feed on the leaves of Grindelia species. They create an annulate case.

References

vancouverensis
Moths of North America
Moths described in 1944